Lloyd Norman Axworthy  (born December 21, 1939) is a Canadian politician, elder statesman and academic. He served as Minister of Foreign Affairs in the Cabinet chaired by Prime Minister Jean Chrétien. Following his retirement from parliament, he served as president and vice-chancellor of the University of Winnipeg from 2004 to 2014 and as chancellor of St. Paul's University College (a constituent institution of the University of Waterloo). He is currently the Chair of the World Refugee & Migration Council.

Biography 
Axworthy was born in North Battleford, Saskatchewan, to parents Norman and Gwen Axworthy and into a family with strong United Church roots, and received his BA from United College, a Winnipeg-based Bible school, in 1961. He is the older brother of Tom Axworthy, Robert Axworthy (former Manitoba Liberal Party leadership candidate). He received his Ph.D. in politics from Princeton University in 1972 after completing a doctoral dissertation titled "The task force on housing and urban development: a study of democratic decision making in Canada." He returned to Canada to teach at the University of Manitoba and the University of Winnipeg. At the latter, he also became the director of the Institute of Urban Affairs.

Early political career
Axworthy became involved in politics during the 1950s, becoming a member of the Liberal Party after attending a speech by Lester B. Pearson.  He briefly aligned himself with the New Democratic Party (NDP) in the 1960s when Pearson, as federal opposition leader, called for American Bomarc nuclear warheads to be allowed on Canadian soil. He soon returned to the Liberal fold, however, and worked as an executive assistant for John Turner;  he supported Turner's bid to become party leader at the 1968 leadership convention.

Axworthy ran for the party in Winnipeg North Centre in the 1968 election, finishing second against veteran NDP Member of Parliament (MP) Stanley Knowles. He first ran for the Legislative Assembly of Manitoba in the 1966 election, placing second to Progressive Conservative Douglas Stanes in St. James. In the 1973 election, he was elected as a Manitoba Liberal in Fort Rouge, He was re-elected in the 1977 election, and was the only Liberal in the legislature from 1977 to 1979.

Federal government
He resigned from the Manitoba legislature on April 6, 1979, to run for the federal House of Commons, and in the 1979 election narrowly defeated former provincial PC leader Sidney Spivak in Winnipeg—Fort Garry. He was re-elected in the 1980 election, becoming the only Liberal MP west of Ontario. He was promoted to cabinet under Prime Minister Pierre Trudeau, serving as Minister of Employment and Immigration, and then as Minister of Transport.

In the Liberal defeat in the 1984 election, Axworthy was one of only two Liberals west of Ontario to be elected (the other being then Liberal leader John Turner). Axworthy played a role in opposition, supporting tough on crime policies, but also supporting fiscal conservatism by critiquing the fiscal taxation policy of Brian Mulroney. He was an especially vocal critic of the Canada–United States Free Trade Agreement.

When the Liberals returned to power in 1993 under Jean Chrétien, Axworthy became a Cabinet minister. After the election, he was given responsibility for the Human Resources Development Canada (HRDC), and launched changes in employment insurance. Although his main interest was urban renewal, in a 1996 cabinet shuffle, he became Minister of Foreign Affairs.

In February 1999 and April 2000, Axworthy was President of the United Nations Security Council with Canada's Ambassador to the UN Robert Fowler. In April 2000, Axworthy supported the highly controversial effort to reduce the sanction against Iraq, under the regime of Saddam Hussein, citing a humanitarian explanation "to avoid making ordinary citizens pay for the actions of their leaders". Axworthy clashed with the US government on this issue, particularly over the lack of alternative options to deter the regime from additional aggression. In 2000, he initiated the International Commission on Intervention and State Sovereignty that led to the UN policy of Responsibility to Protect.

He retired from politics in 2000.

Honours and awards
In 1997, Axworthy was nominated by United States Senator Patrick Leahy to receive the Nobel Peace Prize for his work on banning land mines. He did not win, but was thanked by the recipients, the International Campaign to Ban Landmines, as having been instrumental in their effort. Critics, however, viewed Axworthy's land mine campaign and the involvement of political NGOs as counter-productive, since many key nations, including the US, Russia and China did not join.

In 1998, he was one of the two winners of the North–South Prize. In 2003, he was made an Officer of the Order of Canada and elected a Foreign Honorary Member of the American Academy of Arts and Sciences.

On October 15, 2012, Elder, Dr. Tobasonakwut Kinew and, Dr. Phil Fontaine, honoured Axworthy – Waapshki Pinaysee Inini, Free Range Frog Man, at a sacred Pipe Ceremony. Axworthy was recognized for his commitment to creating an inclusive learning experience that reflects Indigenous cultures and traditions at UWinnipeg. The ceremony was led by Anishinaabe Elder Fred Kelly and musician and broadcaster Wab Kinew.

Axworthy was presented with an honorary doctorate from the Faculty of Environment of the University of Waterloo in October 2014.

On December 30, 2015, Axworthy was promoted to Companion of the Order of Canada, the highest grade of the honour.

After politics

In September 2000, Axworthy returned to academia, joining the Liu Institute for Global Issues at the University of British Columbia. He has published Navigating A New World, a book on the uses of "soft power".

In May 2004, he was appointed as president and vice-chancellor of the University of Winnipeg. He retired in June 2014.

Axworthy is Chair of the Advisory Committee for the Americas Division of Human Rights Watch, a highly controversial position resulting from this organisation's record of political bias, fundraising in Saudi Arabia, and lack of credibility. He also serves on the advisory council of USC Center on Public Diplomacy and of Fair Vote Canada, and is an endorser of the Genocide Intervention Network and International Student Exchange, Ontario.

In 2006, Axworthy was elected to the Board of Directors of Hudbay Minerals, Inc.

He currently serves as the President of the World Federalist Movement-Institute for Global Policy.

Axworthy was installed as Chancellor of St. Paul's University College, a constituent institution of the University of Waterloo, in October 2014. He retired from that position in 2017.

Axworthy is the first Chair of the World Refugee & Migration Council, formed in 2017 by the Centre for International Governance Innovation.

Publications
 Navigating a New World, Knopf Canada Publishing, 2004
 Liberals at the Border, University of Toronto Press, 2004
 The Axworthy Legacy, Edited by O. Hampson, N. Hillmer, M. Appel Molot, Oxford University Press, 2001
 ''Boulevard of Broken Dreams: A 40 Year Journey through Portage Avenue - Displacement, Dislocation, and How Osmosis Can Resolve Community Blight', Rattray Canada Publishing, 2014 (In Press)

Electoral history

References

External links
Lecture transcript and video of Axworthy's speech at the Joan B. Kroc Institute for Peace & Justice at the University of San Diego, February 2005 

Order of Canada Citation

1939 births
Canadian Ministers of Transport
Canadian political scientists
Companions of the Order of Canada
Presidents of the University of Winnipeg
Liberal Party of Canada MPs
Living people
Manitoba Liberal Party MLAs
Members of the House of Commons of Canada from Manitoba
Members of the Order of Manitoba
Members of the King's Privy Council for Canada
Members of the United Church of Canada
People from North Battleford
Princeton University alumni
Academic staff of the University of Manitoba
University of Winnipeg alumni
Canadian Ministers of Foreign Affairs
Fellows of the American Academy of Arts and Sciences
Canadian university and college chief executives
Members of the 22nd Canadian Ministry
Members of the 23rd Canadian Ministry
Members of the 26th Canadian Ministry